Barry Doss from Leoma, Tennessee is an American politician and a former  Republican member of the Tennessee House of Representatives representing District 70 from January 8, 2013 to January 8, 2019.

Education
Doss earned his BS in animal science from University of Tennessee.

Elections
2012 When District 70 Republican Representative Joey Hensley ran for Tennessee Senate and left the seat open, Doss ran in the three-way August 2, 2012 Republican Primary, winning with 4,294 votes (60.6%), and won the three-way November 6, 2012 General election with 11,496 votes (51.1%) against Democratic nominee Calvin Moore (who had run for the seat in 2010) and Independent candidate John Johnson. 
Barry Doss lost to primary challenger Clay Doggett, 48%(4,924) to 52%(5,277) on August 2, 2018.

References

External links
Official page at the Tennessee General Assembly

Barry Doss at Ballotpedia
Barry Doss at the National Institute on Money in State Politics

Place of birth missing (living people)
Year of birth missing (living people)
Living people
Republican Party members of the Tennessee House of Representatives
People from Lawrence County, Tennessee
University of Tennessee alumni
21st-century American politicians